The Tioman Island bent-toed gecko (Cyrtodactylus tiomanensis) is a species of gecko that is endemic to Tioman Island in Malaysia.

References 

Cyrtodactylus
Reptiles described in 2000